Mortimer's Patch was a popular TVNZ police drama from the early 1980s. It featured actors Terence Cooper, Sean Duffy, Don Selwyn and Jim Hickey and depicted detective and police work in the fictional town of "Cobham". It was filmed in and around Helensville, New Zealand.

References

External links
Mortimer's Patch at the IMDb database
First episode at NZonscreen.com

New Zealand drama television series
1980s New Zealand television series
1980 New Zealand television series debuts
1984 New Zealand television series endings
TVNZ original programming
Detective television series